Ohta, Ōta, or Ota may refer to the following:

People 
 Ota (wife of Arnulf of Carinthia), Queen of the East Franks 888-899, Empress of the Holy Roman Empire 896-899
Ota (cartoonist), Brazilian cartoonist
 Atsuya Ota, Japanese basketball player
 Fusae Ohta, Japanese politician
 Herb Ohta, Hawaiian ukulele player
 Hikari Ōta, manzai comedian
 Hiromi Ōta, Japanese female singer who was considered an idol in Japan during the 1970s
 Keibun Ōta, Japanese painter and illustrator
 , Japanese-Mexican sculptor
 Michihiko Ohta, Japanese singer, composer and arranger
 Minoru Ōta (1891–1945), Japanese admiral in World War II
 , Japanese cross-country skier
 Mizuho Ōta (1876–1955), poet and scholar
 Nanami Ohta, Japanese actress
 , Japanese rower
 Princess Ōta (7th century AD), the eldest daughter of emperor Tenji
 Ryu Ota (1930–2009), Japanese New Left activist, author, and ecologist
 , Japanese cyclist
 Shinichiro Ohta, Japanese voice actor and television announcer known for the Iron Chef series
 , Japanese footballer
 , Japanese footballer
 Ōta Sukemoto (1799–1867), daimyō of Edo period
 , Japanese sport wrestler
 Tetsuharu Ōta, Japanese voice actor
 , Japanese triple jumper
 Tomoko Ohta (1933– ), Japanese molecular evolution scientist
 Toshio Ōta (1919–1942), Japanese fighter pilot
 Toshi Seeger (1922–2013), née Toshi Aline Ohta
 Yukina Ota, Japanese figure skater
 Yuki Ota, Olympic fencer

Geography

Japan 
 , a Special Ward of the Japanese capital city
 , a city northwest of Tokyo in the Gunma prefecture
 , the major river in the Hiroshima prefecture

Other places 
 Okhta River (Neva basin), a river in Russia
 Ota (Alenquer), a town and a parish in the municipality of Alenquer, near Lisbon, Portugal
 Ota, Corse-du-Sud, a municipality in south Corsica, France
 Ota, Ogun, a city in Ogun State, Nigeria
 Ota Airport, Portugal

Companies 
 Ohta Jidosha, one of the largest Japanese automotive manufacturing companies in the 1930s
 Ohta Publishing, Japanese publishing company
 OHTA, for Organ Historical Trust of Australia

Fictional characters 
 Akihiko Ohta, the owner of a grocery store in the Muteki Kanban Musume manga series
 Isao Ohta, a police pilot in the Patlabor anime and manga franchise
 Ota Matsushita, a character in AI: The Somnium Files

Other uses 
 5868 Ohta, a main-belt asteroid
 Operational transconductance amplifier, OpAmp-like device that converts an input voltage to an output current

See also 
 Okhta (disambiguation)
 OTA (disambiguation)
 Otta (disambiguation)

Japanese-language surnames